Bar Beach is an inner city suburb of Newcastle, New South Wales, Australia, located  southwest of Newcastle's central business district. The suburb is named for the beach that extends along its eastern border.

The beach is home to the Cooks Hill Surf Life Saving Club.

History 
The Australian Agricultural Company held extensive Crown land grants in the Newcastle area that have since been developed into the modern day suburbs of Bar Beach, Cooks Hill, Hamilton and Broadmeadow as well as parts of the Newcastle Central Business District and The Hill. The Company released lots for residential development in Bar Beach in 1924.

A natural rock pool at the beach was named "The Bar" and Bar Beach took its name from that feature.

Population 
In the 2016 Census, there were 1,256 people in Bar Beach. 77.3% of people were born in Australia and 86.8% of people only spoke English at home. The most common responses for religion were No Religion 33.7%, Catholic 23.2% and Anglican 15.5%.

Shipwrecks 
The northern part of the beach is commonly known as Susan Gilmore Beach, named after the American clipper Susan Gilmore that was wrecked there in the early hours of 4 July 1884.

Heritage 
The suburb has a number of local landmarks which have been heritage listed including the Cooks Hill Surf Life Saving Club and Memorial, Reid Park Tennis Clubhouse and Tennis Courts and the Empire Park Bowling Club Fence. A number of residential units in the Art Deco style have also attracted heritage listing.

Gallery

Notes

References 

Suburbs of Newcastle, New South Wales
Beaches of New South Wales